Rüstəmlı or Rəstəmli or Rustamly may refer to:
Rüstəmlı, Sabirabad, Azerbaijan
Rüstəmlı, Yevlakh, Azerbaijan